Joseph Curtel (21 November 1893 – 2 September 1960) was a French racing cyclist. He rode in the 1923 Tour de France.

References

1893 births
1960 deaths
French male cyclists
Place of birth missing